Bolt-action is a type of manual firearm action that is operated by directly manipulating the bolt via a bolt handle, which is most commonly placed on the right-hand side of the weapon (as most users are right-handed).

Most bolt-action firearms use a rotating bolt design, where the handle must first be rotated upward to unlock the bolt from the receiver, then pulled back to open the breech and allowing any spent cartridge case to be extracted and ejected.  This also cocks the striker within the bolt (either on opening or closing of the bolt depending on the gun design) and engages it against the sear.  When the bolt is returned to the forward position, a new cartridge (if available) is pushed out of the magazine and into the barrel chamber, and finally the breech is closed tight by rotating the handle down so the bolt head relocks on the receiver.

Bolt-action firearms are generally repeating firearms, but some single-shot breechloaders also use bolt-action design as a breechblock mechanism. The majority of these firearms are rifles, but there are some bolt-action variants of shotguns and handguns as well.  Examples of these date as far back as the early 19th century, notably in the Dreyse needle gun.  From the late 19th century all the way through both World Wars, bolt-action rifles were the standard infantry service weapons for most of the world's military forces.  In modern military and law enforcement, bolt-action firearms have been mostly replaced by semi-automatic and selective-fire firearms, and have remained prevalent only as sniper rifles due to the design's inherent potential for superior accuracy and precision, as well as ruggedness and reliability compared to autoloading designs.

History
The first bolt-action rifle was produced in 1824 by Johann Nikolaus von Dreyse, following work on breechloading rifles that dated to the 18th century. Von Dreyse would perfect his Nadelgewehr (Needle Rifle) by 1836, and it was adopted by the Prussian Army in 1841. While it saw limited service in the German Revolutions of 1848, it was not fielded widely until the 1864 victory over Denmark. In 1850 a metallic centerfire bolt-action breechloader was patented by Béatus Beringer. In 1852 another metallic centerfire bolt-action breechloader was patented by Joseph Needham and improved upon in 1862 with another patent. Two different systems for primers –the mechanism to ignite a metallic cartridge's powder charge – were invented in the 1860s as well, the Berdan and the Boxer systems.

The United States purchased 900 Greene rifles (an under hammer, percussion capped, single-shot bolt-action that used paper cartridges and an ogival bore rifling system) in 1857, which saw service at the Battle of Antietam in 1862, during the American Civil War; however, this weapon was ultimately considered too complicated for issue to soldiers and was supplanted by the Springfield Model 1861, a conventional muzzle loading rifle. During the American Civil War, the bolt-action Palmer carbine was patented in 1863, and by 1865, 1000 were purchased for use as cavalry weapons. The French Army adopted its first bolt-action rifle, the Chassepot rifle, in 1866 and followed with the metallic cartridge bolt-action Gras rifle in 1874.

European armies continued to develop bolt-action rifles through the latter half of the 19th century, first adopting tubular magazines as on the Kropatschek rifle and the Lebel rifle. The first bolt-action repeating rifle was patented in Britain in 1855 by an unidentified inventor through the patent agent Auguste Edouard Loradoux Bellford using a gravity-operated tubular magazine in the stock. Another more well-known bolt-action repeating rifle was the Vetterli rifle of 1867 and the first bolt-action repeating rifle to use centerfire cartridges was the weapon designed by the Viennese gunsmith Ferdinand Fruwirth in 1871. Ultimately, the military turned to bolt-action rifles using a box magazine; the first of its kind was the M1885 Remington–Lee, but the first to be generally adopted was the British 1888 Lee–Metford. World War I marked the height of the bolt-action rifle's use, with all of the nations in that war fielding troops armed with various bolt-action designs.

During the buildup prior to World War II, the military bolt-action rifle began to be superseded by semi-automatic rifles and later fully automatic rifles, though bolt-action rifles remained the primary weapon of most of the combatants for the duration of the war; and many American units, especially the USMC, used bolt-action M1903 Springfields until sufficient numbers of M1 Garands were made available. The bolt-action is still common today among sniper rifles, as the design has the potential for superior accuracy, reliability, lesser weight, and the ability to control loading over the faster rate of fire that alternatives allow. There are, however, many semi-automatic sniper rifle designs, especially in the designated marksman role.

Today, bolt-action rifles are chiefly used as hunting rifles. These rifles can be used to hunt anything from vermin to deer and to large game, especially big game caught on a safari, as they are adequate to deliver a single lethal shot from a safe distance.

Bolt-action shotguns are considered a rarity among modern firearms but were formerly a commonly used action for .410 entry-level shotguns, as well as for low-cost 12-gauge shotguns. The M26 Modular Accessory Shotgun System (MASS) is the most advanced and recent example of a bolt-action shotgun, albeit one designed to be attached to an M16 rifle or M4 carbine using an underbarrel mount (although with the standalone kit, the MASS can become a standalone weapon).  Mossberg 12-gauge bolt-action shotguns were briefly popular in Australia after the 1997 changes to firearms laws, but the shotguns themselves were awkward to operate and had only a three-round magazine, thus offering no practical and real advantages over a conventional double-barrel shotgun.

Some pistols use a bolt-action, although this is uncommon, and such examples are typically specialized target handguns.

Major bolt-action systems

Rotating bolt

Most of the bolt-action designs use a rotating bolt (or "turn pull") design, which involves the shooter doing an upward "rotating" movement of the handle to unlock the bolt from the breech and cock the firing pin, followed by a rearward "pull" to open the breech, extract the spent cartridge case, then reverse the whole process to chamber the next cartridge and relock the breech. There are four major turn bolt-action designs: the Remington M-700, possibly the single most numerous produced rifle in history which is now also used as basis for most custom competition rifle actions, along with the Mauser system, the Lee–Enfield system, and the Mosin–Nagant system. All four differ in the way the bolt fits into the receiver, how the bolt rotates as it is being operated, the number of locking lugs holding the bolt in place as the gun is fired, and whether the action is cocked on the opening of the bolt (as in both the Mauser system and the Mosin Nagant system) or the closing of the bolt (as in the Lee–Enfield system). The vast majority of modern bolt-action rifles were made for the commercial market post-war, numbering in the tens of millions by Remington in the unique, and most accurate Model 700, two of the others use the Mauser system, with other designs such as the Lee–Enfield system and the Mosin Nagant system, of only limited usage.

Mauser

The Mauser bolt-action system is based on 19th-century Mauser bolt-action rifle designs and was finalized in the Gewehr 98 designed by Paul Mauser. It is the most common bolt-action system in the world, being in use in nearly all modern hunting rifles and the majority of military bolt-action rifles until the middle of the 20th century. The Mauser system is stronger than that of the Lee–Enfield due to two locking lugs just behind the bolt head, which make it better able to handle higher-pressure cartridges (i.e. magnum cartridges). The 9.3×64mm Brenneke and 8×68mm S magnum rifle cartridge "families" were designed for the Mauser M 98 bolt-action. A novel safety feature was the introduction of a third locking lug present at the rear of the bolt that normally did not lock the bolt, since it would introduce asymmetrical locking forces. The Mauser system features "cock on opening", meaning the upward rotation of the bolt when the rifle is opened cocks the action. A drawback of the Mauser M 98 system is that it cannot be cheaply mass-produced very easily. Many Mauser M 98-inspired derivatives feature technical alterations, such as omitting the third safety locking lug, to simplify production.

The controlled-feed Mauser M 98 bolt-action system's simple, strong, safe, and well-thought-out design inspired other military and hunting/sporting rifle designs that became available during the 20th century, including the:
Gewehr 98/Standardmodell/Karabiner 98k
M24 series
vz. 24/vz. 33
Type 24 rifle
M1903 Springfield
Pattern 1914 Enfield
M1917 Enfield
Arisaka Type 38/Type 99
M48 Mauser
Kb wz. 98a/Karabinek wz. 1929
FR8
modern hunting/sporting rifles like the CZ 550, Heym Express Magnum, Winchester Model 70 and the Mauser M 98
modern sniper rifles like the Sako TRG, Accuracy International Arctic Warfare and GOL Sniper Magnum

Versions of the Mauser action designed prior to the Gewehr 98's introduction, such as that of the Swedish Mauser rifles and carbines, lack the third locking lug and feature a "cock on closing" operation.

Lee–Enfield

The Lee–Enfield bolt-action system was introduced in 1889 with the Lee–Metford and later Lee–Enfield rifles (the bolt system is named after the designer James Paris Lee and the barrel rifling after the Royal Small Arms Factory at the London Borough of Enfield), and is a "cock on closing" action in which the forward thrust of the bolt cocks the action. This enables a shooter to keep eyes on sights and targets uninterrupted by cycling the bolt. The ability of the bolt between lugs and chamber to flex also keeps the shooter safer in case of catastrophic chamber overpressure. The disadvantage of the rearward-located bolt lugs is that a larger part of the receiver, between chamber and lugs, must be made stronger and heavier to resist stretching forces. Also, the bolt ahead of the lugs may flex on firing which, although a safety advantage, may eventually lead to increased head space. Repeated firing over time can lead to receiver "stretch" and excessive headspace, which if perceived as a problem can be remedied by changing the removable bolt head to a larger sized one (the Lee–Enfield bolt manufacture involved a mass production method where at final assembly the bolt body was fitted with one of three standard size bolt heads for correct headspace). In the years leading up to WWII, the Lee–Enfield bolt system was used in numerous commercial sporting and hunting rifles manufactured by such firms in the UK as BSA, LSA, and Parker–Hale, as well as by SAF Lithgow in Australia. Vast numbers of ex-military SMLE Mk III rifles were sporterised post WWII to create cheap, effective hunting rifles, and the Lee–Enfield bolt system is used in the M10 and No 4 Mk IV rifles manufactured by Australian International Arms. Rifle Factory Ishapore of India manufactures a hunting and sporting rifle chambered in .315 which also employs the Lee Enfield action.

Lee–Enfield (all marks and models)
Ishapore 2A1
Various hunting/sporting rifles manufactured by BSA, LSA, SAF Lithgow, and Parker Hale
Australian International Arms M10 and No 4 Mk IV hunting/sporting rifles
Rifle Factory Ishapore's hunting Lee Enfield rifle in .315

Mosin–Nagant

The Mosin–Nagant action, created in 1891 and named after the designers Sergei Mosin and Léon Nagant, differs significantly from the Mauser and Lee–Enfield bolt-action designs.  The Mosin–Nagant design has a separate bolthead that rotates with the bolt and the bearing lugs, in contrast to the Mauser system where the bolthead is a non-removable part of the bolt. The Mosin–Nagant is also unlike the Lee–Enfield system where the bolthead remains stationary and the bolt body itself rotates. The Mosin–Nagant bolt is a somewhat complicated affair, but is extremely rugged and durable; like the Mauser, it uses a "cock on open" system. Although this bolt system has been rarely used in commercial sporting rifles (the Vostok brand target rifles being the most recognized) and never outside of Russia, large numbers of military surplus Mosin–Nagant rifles have been sporterized for use as hunting rifles in the years since WWII.

Other designs
Both the U.S. Army's M24 Sniper Weapon System and U.S. Marine Corps' M40 sniper rifles are built from the Remington Model 700 rifle, in different degrees of modification, the main difference being the custom fitted heavy contour barrel and action length. The M24 utilizes the Long action and the M40 employs the short action bolt-face. The reason for this is that the M24 was originally intended to chamber the longer .300 Winchester Magnum round. The M40, however, was not intended to be chambered in the more powerful .300 Winchester Magnum round, yet the Marine Corps' intention was to migrate to the .300 Winchester Magnum cartridge. The Marine Corps' delay has led to a change in migratory direction, the current goal is for the M40 to become a rifle chambered in .338 Lapua Magnum.

The United States Army's Joint Munitions and Lethality Contracting Center has awarded Remington a Firm Fixed Price (FFP) Indefinite Delivery/ Indefinite Quantity (ID/IQ) contract (W15QKN-10-R-0403) for the upgrade of up to 3,600 M24 Sniper Weapon Systems (SWS) currently fielded to the Army pending type classification as the “M24E1”. The major configuration change for this system is the caliber conversion from 7.62mm NATO (.308 Winchester) to .300 Winchester Magnum to provide soldiers with additional precision engagement capability and range. The contract is for a five-year period and has a guaranteed minimum value of $192K with a potential value of up to $28.2 million. This award follows a full and open competitive evaluation lasting nine months, which began with the release of the Army's Request for Proposal (RFP) on January 13, 2010. The program will be executed under the authority of Project Manager Soldier Weapons, Picatinny Arsenal, NJ, and managed by its subordinate unit, Product Manager Individual Weapons. In 2009 the U.S. Army has changed the weapon name from M24E1 to the XM2010 Enhanced Sniper Rifle.

The Vetterli rifle was the first bolt-action repeating rifle introduced by an army. It was used by the Swiss army from 1869 to circa 1890. Modified Vetterlis were also used by the Italian Army. Another notable design is the Norwegian Krag–Jørgensen, which was used by Norway, Denmark, and briefly the United States. It is unusual among bolt-action rifles in that is loaded through a gate on the right side of the receiver, and thus can be reloaded without opening the bolt. The Norwegian and Danish versions of the Krag have two locking lugs, while the American version has only one. In all versions, the bolt handle itself serves as an emergency locking lug. The Krag's major disadvantage compared to other bolt-action designs is that it is usually loaded by hand, one round at a time, although a box-like device was made that could drop five rounds into the magazine, all at once via a stripper or en bloc clip. This made it slower to reload than other designs which used stripper or en bloc clips. Another historically important bolt-action system was the Gras system, used on the French Mle 1874 Gras rifle, Mle 1886 Lebel rifle (which was the first to introduce ammunition loaded with nitrocellulose-based smokeless powder), and the Berthier series of rifles.

Straight pull

Straight-pull bolt-actions differ from conventional turn-pull bolt-action mechanisms in that the bolt can be cycled back and forward without rotating the handle and thus only a linear motion is required, as opposed to a traditional bolt-action, where the user has to axially rotate the bolt in addition to the linear motions to perform chambering and primary extraction.  The bolt locking of a straight pull action is achieved differently without needing manual inputs, therefore the entire operating cycle needs the shooter to perform only two movements (pull back and push forward), instead of four movements (rotate up, pull back, push forward, and rotate down), this greatly increases the rate of fire of the gun.

In 1993 the German Blaser company introduced the Blaser R93, a new straight pull action where locking is achieved by a series of concentric "claws" that protrude/retract from the bolthead, a design that is referred to as Radialbundverschluss ("radial connection"). As of 2017 the Rifle Shooter magazine listed its successor Blaser R8 as one of the three most popular straight pull rifles together with Merkel Helix and Browning Maral. Some other notable modern straight pull rifles are made by Beretta, C.G. Haenel, Chapuis, Heym, Lynx, Rößler, Savage Arms, Strasser, and Steel Action.

Most straight bolt rifles have a firing mechanism without a hammer, but there are some hammer-fired models, such as the Merkel Helix. Firearms using a hammer usually have a comparably longer lock time than hammerless mechanisms.

In the sport of biathlon, because shooting speed is an important performance factor and semi-automatic guns are illegal for race use, straight pull actions are quite common and are used almost exclusively in the Biathlon World Cup. The first company to make the straight pull action for .22 caliber was J. G. Anschütz; the action is specifically the straight pull ball bearing lock action, which features spring-loaded ball bearings on the side of the bolt which lock into a groove inside the bolt's housing.  With the new design came a new dry fire method; instead of the bolt being turned up slightly, the action is locked back to catch the firing pin.

Operating the bolt 
Typically, the bolt consists of a tube of metal inside of which the firing mechanism is housed, and which has at the front or rear of the tube several metal knobs, or "lugs", which serve to lock the bolt in place. The operation can be done via a rotating bolt, a lever, cam action, a locking piece, or a number of systems. Straight pull designs have seen a great deal of use, though manual turn bolt designs are what is most commonly thought of in reference to a bolt-action design due to the type ubiquity. As a result, the bolt-action term is often reserved for more modern types of rotating bolt designs when talking about a specific weapon's type of action. However, both straight pull and rotating bolt rifles are types of bolt-action rifles. Lever-action and pump-action weapons must still operate the bolt, but they are usually grouped separately from bolt-actions that are operated by a handle directly attached to a rotating bolt. Early bolt-action designs, such as the Dreyse needle gun and the Mauser Model 1871, locked by dropping the bolt handle or bolt guide rib into a notch in the receiver, this method is still used in .22 rimfire rifles. The most common locking method is a rotating bolt with two lugs on the bolt head, which was used by the Lebel Model 1886 rifle, Model 1888 Commission Rifle, Mauser M 98, Mosin–Nagant and most bolt-action rifles. The Lee–Enfield has a lug and guide rib, which lock on the rear end of the bolt into the receiver.

Bolt knob 
The bolt knob is the part of the bolt handle that the user grips when loading and reloading the firearm and thereby acts as a cocking handle. On many older firearms, the bolt knob is welded to the bolt handle, and as such becoming an integral part of the bolt handle itself. On many newer firearms, the bolt knob is instead threaded onto the handle, allowing the user to change the original bolt knob for an aftermarket one, either for aesthetical reasons, achieving better grip or similar. The type of threads used vary between firearms. European firearms often use either M6 1 or M8 1.25 threads, for example M6 is used on the SIG Sauer 200 STR, Blaser R93, Blaser R8, CZ 457 and Bergara rifles, while M8 is used on the Sako TRG and SIG Sauer 404. Many American firearms instead use 1/4" 28 TPI (6.35 0.907 mm) or 5/16" 24 TPI (7.9375 1.058 mm) threads. Some other thread types are also used, for example, No. 10 32 TPI (4.826 0.794 mm) as used by Mausingfield. There also exists aftermarket slip-on bolt handle covers which are mounted without having to remove the existing bolt handle. These are often made of either rubber or plastic.

Reloading
Most bolt-action firearms are fed by an internal magazine loaded by hand, by en bloc, or stripper clips, though a number of designs have had a detachable magazine or independent magazine, or even no magazine at all, thus requiring that each round be independently loaded. Generally, the magazine capacity is limited to between two and ten rounds, as it can permit the magazine to be flush with the bottom of the rifle, reduce the weight, or prevent mud and dirt from entering. A number of bolt-actions have a tube magazine, such as along the length of the barrel. In weapons other than large rifles, such as pistols and cannons, there were some manually operated breech-loading weapons. However, the Dreyse Needle fire rifle was the first breech loader to use a rotating bolt design. Johann Nicholas von Dreyse's rifle of 1838 was accepted into service by Prussia in 1841, which was in turn developed into the Prussian Model in 1849. The design was a single shot breech-loader and had the now familiar arm sticking out from the side of the bolt, to turn and open the chamber. The entire reloading sequence was a more complex procedure than later designs, however, as the firing pin had to be independently primed and activated, and the lever was used only to move the bolt.

See also
Antique guns
British military rifles
Service rifle
List of bolt action rifles

Other firearm actions 
Break action
Falling block action
Lever action
Pump action
Rolling block
Rotating bolt
Semi automatic rifle
Automatic rifle
Blowback operated
Recoil operated
Gas operated

References

Further reading

External links

Firearm actions